Propristis is an extinct genus of sawfish that lived from the Eocene to the Miocene. It contains two valid species, P. schweinfurthi and P. mayumbensis. It has been found in Egypt, Cabinda, Morocco, Qatar, Spain, the United Kingdom, and the United States. Isolated rostral denticles are the most common remains, but rostra have also been found.

References

Prehistoric fish genera
Pristidae
Species described in 1883